The Scottish Parliament (Holyrood), created by the Scotland Act 1998, has used a system of constituencies and electoral regions since the first general election in 1999.

The parliament has 73 constituencies, each electing one Member of the Scottish Parliament (MSP) by the plurality (first past the post) system of voting, and eight additional member regions, each electing seven additional MSPs. Each region is a group of constituencies, and the D'Hondt method of allocating additional member seats from party lists is used to produce a form of proportional representation for each region. The total number of parliamentary seats is 129. For lists of MSPs, see Member of the Scottish Parliament.

Boundaries of Holyrood and British House of Commons (Westminster) constituencies are subject to review by the Boundary Commission for Scotland, and prior to the Scottish Parliament (Constituencies) Act 2004 reviews of Scottish Westminster constituencies would have been also reviews of Holyrood constituencies. The Arbuthnott Commission, in its final report, January 2006, recommended that council area boundaries and Holyrood and Scottish Westminster constituency boundaries should all be reviewed together. This recommendation has not been implemented.

Boundaries

1999–2011 

Until the 2005 United Kingdom general election the first past the post constituencies were the same as for the House of Commons (United Kingdom Parliament, Westminster), except for Orkney and Shetland, which were separate constituencies at Holyrood, but not at Westminster.  The Scottish Parliament (Constituencies) Act 2004 enabled a new set of House of Commons constituencies to be formed in Scotland in 2005, reducing their number and, therefore, the number of Scottish Members of Parliament (MPs) to 59, without change to the Holyrood constituencies and the number of MSPs.

1999 boundaries were used also for the 2003 and 2007 elections.

2011–present 

The first periodical review of boundaries of Scottish Parliament constituencies was announced on 3 July 2007, and the commission's final recommendations were implemented for the 2011 Scottish Parliament election.

Total numbers of constituencies, regions, and MSPs remain at, respectively, 73, 8, and 129.

References 

Parliament constituencies